Nada Aljeraiwi (born 24 June 1985) is a Kuwaiti professional racing cyclist. She rode in the women's time trial and women's road race at the 2016 UCI Road World Championships, but she did not finish the race.

She is the older sister of road cyclist Najla Aljeraiwi who also competed at the 2016 UCI Road World Championships.

References

External links
 

1985 births
Living people
Kuwaiti female cyclists
Place of birth missing (living people)